Tour de Normandie is a road bicycle race held annually in the region of Normandy, France. The race started in 1939, but was not held in the periods of 1940–1955 and 1960–1980. It was originally a race for amateurs, but was opened for professionals in 1996. The Tour de Normandie has been one of the races in the UCI Europe Tour since 2005, in the 2.2 category. The race was not held in 2020 and 2021 due to the COVID-19 pandemic

Winners

References

External links
 

UCI Europe Tour races
Cycle races in France
Recurring sporting events established in 1939
1939 establishments in France